Eszter Mattioni (1902 in Szekszárd – 1993 in Budapest) was a prominent twentieth century Hungarian painter.

For five years she attended the Applied Arts Vocational School, and between 1931 and 1942 she worked with group of artists known as Zugliget, which included Vilmos Aba-Novák, Károly Patkó, Emil Kelemen, Jenő Barcsay and Ernő Bánk.

She made study trips to Italy in 1935 where she met her future husband and to the Scandinavian countries in 1939 increasing her recognition and acclaim across Europe. In 1940, she was elected Honorary Life Member. In 1946, she became Member of the Pál Szinyei Merse Society which featured the most prominent painters of Hungary.

References

External links and sources 

 Eszter Mattioni at Fine Arts in Hungary
 Galeria origo

1902 births
1993 deaths
People from Szekszárd
Hungarian educators
Hungarian women painters
Hungarian women educators
20th-century Hungarian painters
20th-century Hungarian women artists